Hainan University (Hainan U or HNU), commonly referred to as Haida, is a national-provincial public comprehensive university in Haikou, Hainan, China. 

It is a comprehensive key university formed by a merger with the former South China University of Tropical Agriculture in August 2007. It is jointly administered by the Ministry of Education and the Hainan Provincial People's Government. In December 2008, it was approved by the state as a key university under the Double First Class University Plan and former Project 211. It is a Chinese state Double First Class University identified by the Ministry of Education.

History
The original Hainan university was established in 1983. It was a key provincial university. On August 14, 2007, the Ministry of Education approved the merger of the South China University of Tropical Agriculture (SCUTA) and Hainan University merged into a single which kept the Hainan University name.

South China University of Tropical Agriculture (South China Institute of Tropical Crops), created in 1958 by the central people's government to break the obstruction and embargo of natural rubber forced by foreign powers. It specialized in rubber and tropical agriculture. It was the only higher education center in Hainan to offer the State Key Disciplines and doctoral programs, which ran in partnership with the China Academy of Tropical Agriculture created in 1954 (South China Academy of Tropical Crops) to have won over 900 education and scientific research awards.

In 2008, Hainan university was approved by the state as a key university under the 211 Project.
In 2012, Hainan University was included in the Plan of Strengthening Higher Education in Middle and Western China and was successively supported by the National Basic Ability Construction Project of Western and Central China and the National Comprehensive Strength Enhancement Project of Western and Central China.
In 2017, Hainan University was listed in the national plan for establishing world-class disciplines.
In 2018, the Hainan provincial Party Committee and provincial government made a strategic decision to fully sponsor the development of Hainan University. Also in that year, the university came under the joint administration of the Ministry of Education and the Hainan Provincial People's Government, and was included among universities directly administered by the Ministry of Education.

Campuses
Hainan University consists of three campuses, with a total area of :

Haidian Campus 
Main campus and is located on Haidian Island in Haikou. It has three main gates: The east gate, located on Renmin Dadao, the north gate, located on Wuxi Lu, and the south gate, located on San Xi Lu.

Chengxi Campus 
Located in Chengxi District of Haikou.

Danzhou Campus 
Located in the city of Danzhou.

Key Labs

State Key Laboratory of Marine Resource Utilization in South China Sea
The State Key Laboratory of Marine Resource Utilization in the South China Sea is both the first state key laboratory for marine resources development, utilization and protection in the South China Sea and the only school-based state key laboratory co-established by Hainan Province and national ministries. In terms of members, Academician Zhang Si is currently the director of the Academic Committee, Professor Li Jianbao is the director of the Lab, and Professor Wang Ning is its deputy director.

Hainan Key Laboratory for Sustainable Utilization of Tropical Bioresources
The Hainan Key Laboratory for Sustainable Utilization of Tropical Bioresources – State-level national key laboratory and cultivation base co-founded by Hainan province and Ministry of Science and Technology was established in 2010 by the Ministry of Science and Technology. Based on the needs of social and economic development and discipline construction in Hainan province, the laboratory takes the characteristic tropical crop resources and tropical microorganisms in Hainan province as research objects, and comprehensively and systematically carries out basic research for application on sustainable utilization of tropical bioresources. Research interests include research on tropical agricultural bioresources (collection and utilization of tropical crop resource and tropical microorganism resource, regulation on tropical biological secondary metabolism and biosynthesis research), research on genetic improvement of tropical crops (molecular basis of regulation on important agronomic traits of major tropical crops, research on disease-resistant and stress-resistant molecular mechanism of tropical crops, molecular breeding of major tropical crops), research on new tropical ecological agriculture technologies (tropical efficient ecological agriculture and material recycling, degradation and restoration of tropical agro-ecosystem, research on efficient use of tropical crop nutrient and key technology to improve quality). The establishment of a theoretical system and technology platform for the sustainable use of tropical bioresources and the domestic leading tropical agrobiology research center is praised by international counterparts in the tropics, promoting the construction and development of the first-class crop science discipline of Hainan University.

Gallery

See also
Double First Class University Plan
List of universities and colleges in Hainan
List of universities in China
Higher education in China

References

External links
 
Official Website Chinese Version
Official Website English Version
Haikou Campus map

 
Universities and colleges in Hainan
Educational institutions established in 1958
1958 establishments in China
Organizations based in Haikou